or  is a lake in the municipality of Rana in Nordland county, Norway.

See also
 List of lakes in Norway
 Geography of Norway

References

Rana, Norway
Lakes of Nordland